The German Crown Jewels encompass the Imperial Regalia of the German Kingdom within the Holy Roman Empire until 1806. From 1871 until 1918 the Prussians kings redenominated the Prussian Crown Jewels as Crown jewels of the German Emperors. Formally the German Empire had no physical Crown jewels, though a model of a German State Crown was created and used in emblems. 

The term may also be used in reference to regalia of the various constitutive German monarchies that sprang from the Holy Roman Empire and later were unified in the German Empire.

Since the end of the German monarchies in 1918, the regalia and jewels of the different states have been kept in museums since all of Germany remains under republican rule.

Crown jewels
Monarchy in Germany
National symbols of Germany